Oscar and Arabella is a children's picture book by Neal Layton, published in 2002. It won the Nestlé Smarties Book Prize Bronze Award.

Oscar and Arabella are two woolly mammoths living in the Ice Age. They are the protagonists of the series, which also includes Oscar and Arabella, Hot Hot Hot (2004) and Oscar and Arabella and Ormsby (2007).

References

2002 children's books
British children's books
British picture books
Children's fiction books
Books about elephants